Prince Uche Secondus (born 22 March 1955) is a Nigerian businessman, politician, and elder statesman who was the Chairman of the PDP National Working Committee from 2017 and was suspended by the party in 2021. Secondus was acting chairman of the committee from 2015 to 2016. He was the second chairman of the Rivers State People's Democratic Party, a position he held for two terms.

Early life and education
Secondus was born and raised in Andoni. He completed his elementary and secondary education in Rivers State. He further attended the London Chambers of Commerce Institute where he obtained a certificate in Commerce.

Political career
Secondus' desire to improve the lives of Riverians led to his entering politics during the Second Republic in 1978. He served as Rivers State Youth Leader of the National Party of Nigeria (NPN), Rivers State Publicity Secretary of the National Republican Convention (NRC) (1993 – 1998) and a two-term Chairman of the Rivers State People's Democratic Party. While state party chair, he earned the sobriquet "Total Chairman", and headed an influential group in the National Executive Committee known as G.84.

In 2007, Secondus was the South-South Coordinator for the PDP National Campaign Council that organized the campaigns for the party during that year's general elections. In 2008, at the People's Democratic Party Convention, he gained further promotion to National Organizing Secretary, holding office until 2012. Secondus is the pioneer Chairman of the Governing Board of the National Identity Management Commission (NIMC). On 1 September 2013, he was elected Deputy National Chairman of the People's Democratic Party. He also briefly served as acting National Chairman of the party, following the resignation of Adamu Mu'azu in 2015. On 10 December 2017 at the Eagles square, Secondus was elected as the PDP National Working Committee chairman after a keenly contested election. He is regarded as the best PDP chairman ever as his tenure made PDP win more states as an opposition party..

See also
List of people from Rivers State

References

1955 births
Living people
Rivers State Peoples Democratic Party chairs
Businesspeople from Rivers State
21st-century Nigerian politicians
National Working Committee chairs